Madath Thekkepaattu Vasudevan Nair (born 1933 July 15 ), popularly known as MT, is an Indian author, screenplay writer and film director. He is a prolific and versatile writer in modern Malayalam literature, and is one of the masters of post-Independence Indian literature. At the age of 20, as a chemistry undergraduate, he won the prize for the best short story in Malayalam at World Short Story Competition conducted by The New York Herald Tribune. His first major novel Naalukettu (Ancestral Home- translated to English as The Legacy), written at the age of 23, won the Kerala Sahitya Akademi Award in 1958. His other novels include Manju (Mist), Kaalam (Time), Asuravithu (The Prodigal Son - translated to English as The Demon Seed) and Randamoozham (The Second Turn). The deep emotional experiences of his early days have gone into the making of MT's novels. Most of his works are oriented towards the basic Malayalam family structure and culture and many of them were path-breaking in the history of Malayalam literature. His three seminal novels on life in the matriarchal family in Kerala are Naalukettu, Asuravithu, and Kaalam. Randamoozham, which retells the story of the Mahabharatha from the point of view of Bhimasena, is widely credited as his masterpiece.

M. T. Vasudevan Nair is a script writer and director of Malayalam films. He has directed seven films and written the screenplay for around 54 films. He won the National Film Award for Best Screenplay four times for: Oru Vadakkan Veeragatha (1989), Kadavu (1991), Sadayam (1992), and Parinayam (1994), which is the most by anyone in the screenplay category. He was awarded the highest literary award in India, Jnanpith, in 1995 for his overall contribution to Malayalam literature. In 2005, India's third highest civilian honour Padma Bhushan was awarded to him. He has won numerous other awards and recognition including Kendra Sahitya Akademi Award, Kerala Sahitya Akademi Award, Vayalar Award, Vallathol Award, Ezhuthachan Award, Mathrubhumi Literary Award and O. N. V. Literary Award. He was awarded the J.C. Daniel Award for lifetime achievement in Malayalam cinema for the year 2013. He served as the editor of Mathrubhumi Illustrated Weekly for several years. In 2022, he was honoured with the maiden Kerala Jyothi Award, the highest civilian award given by the Kerala Government.

Early life and family

Vasudevan was born in 1933 at Kudallur, a small village in Anakkara panchayat in Pattambi Taluk at northwestern tip of Palakkad district, which shares boundary with Malappuram district on three sides. His native place fell under Malabar District in erstwhile Madras Presidency of the British Raj. He was the youngest of four children born to T. Narayanan Nair and Ammalu Amma. His father was in Ceylon and he spent his early days in Kudallur and in his father's house in Punnayurkulam, a village in the present day Thrissur district. He completed his schooling from Malamakkavu Elementary School and Kumaranelloor High School. He had to break education after high school, and when he joined college in 1949, he was advised to opt for the science stream as it was felt that a degree in science secured a job faster than any other degree. He obtained a degree in chemistry from Victoria College, Palakkad in 1953. He taught mathematics in Pattambi Board High School and Chavakkad Board High School for over a year and worked in M.B. Tutorial College, Palakkad during 1955–56. He also worked as a gramasevakan at a block development office in Taliparamba, Kannur for a few weeks before joining Mathrubhumi Weekly as subeditor in 1957.

MT has been married twice. He married writer and translator Prameela in 1965. They separated after 11 years of marriage. He has a daughter from this marriage, Sithara, who works as a business executive in the United States. In 1977 he married dance artist Kalamandalam Saraswathy with whom he has a daughter, dancer Aswathy Nair. MT resides in Sithara, Kottaram Road, Kozhikode, named after his eldest daughter.

Literary career

Short stories

MT began writing at a very young age, inspired by his elder brothers who wrote time and again in several literary journals and poet Akkitham Achuthan Namboothiri who was his senior at high school. He initially wrote poems but soon changed to prose writing. His first published work was an essay on the diamond industry of ancient India, titled "Pracheenabharathathile Vaira Vyavasayam", which appeared in Keralakshemam, a biweekly published by C. G. Nair from Guruvayoor. His first story "Vishuvaghosham" was published in Madras-based Chitrakeralam magazine in 1948. The story which explores the feelings of a boy too poor to have crackers of his own, as he stands listening to the sounds of crackers coming from the houses of the rich celebrating the new year festival of Vishu: an overwhelming sense of loss, the painful realization that this is the way things are and the way they're likely to stay. His first book, Raktham Puranda Manaltharikal was published in 1952.

MT's first literary prize came to him while he was a student at Victoria College, Palakkad - his short story "Valarthumrigangal" (Pet Animals) won first prize in the World Short Story Competition conducted by The New York Herald Tribune, Hindustan Times and Mathrubhumi in 1954. It was a short story delineating the pathetic plight of circus artistes. The numerous stories that followed dealt with themes culled from widely different milieus and contexts but were uniformly successful and popular.

The noted collections of his stories are Iruttinte Athmavu, Olavum Theeravum, Bandhanam, Varikkuzhi, Dare-e-Salam, Swargam Thurakkunna Samayam, Vaanaprastham and Sherlock. "Iruttinte Athmavu" ("Soul of Darkness"), one of the most celebrated among his short stories, is the heart wrenching story of a 21-year-old man, regarded as a lunatic by everyone and treated abominably. The story reveals the insanity behind the civilised and supposedly sane world. The story "Sherlock" moves between the rural milieu familiar to MT's readers and the sophisticated world of Indian immigrants in the US, highlighting the contrast between them with subtle irony. MT wrote passionately of the cruelty hidden at the heart of a seemingly idyllic rural life ("Kurukkante Kalyanam" or "The Jackal's Wedding" and "Shilalikhithangal" or "Stone Inscriptions") and of the privations endured by those dependent on the agricultural cycle ("Karkitakom" and "Pallivalum Kalchilambum" or "Sacred Sword and Anklets"). In the story "Vanaprastham", he studies the delicately balanced relationship between a teacher and a student that has miraculously survived the years.

M. T. Vasudevan Nair is of the opinion that short story is a genre in which a writer can achieve near perfection. He, along with T. Padmanabhan, serve as bridges between the early modern short story writers in Malayalam, of the so-called renaissance, and the new short story of the late fifties and sixties.

Naalukettu and Asuravithu

MT's debut novel Pathiravum Pakalvelichavum (Midnight and Daylight) was serialised in Mathrubhumi Weekly in 1957. His first major work Naalukettu (The Legacy; 1958) is a veritable depiction of the situation which prevailed in a typical joint family when its fortunes is on a steady decline. The title attributes to Nālukettu, a traditional ancestral home (Taravad) of a Nair joint family. The novel remains a classic in Malayalam fiction. It contributed to the renewal of a literary tradition initiated by S. K. Pottekkatt, Thakazhi Sivasankara Pillai, Vaikkom Muhammad Basheer and Uroob in the 1950s. It was given the Kerala Sahitya Akademi Award in 1959. It has had 23 reprints and was translated into 14 languages and had a record sale of a half a million copies (as of 2008) and still features in the best-seller lists. MT himself adapted the novel into a television film for Doordarshan in 1995. It won the Kerala State Television Award for the year 1996.

Asuravithu (The Demon Seed; 1972) which is set in a fictional Valluvanadan village named Kizhakkemuri can be considered almost as a sequel to Naalukettu. It has the same geophysical and socio-cultural setting. The novel describes the plight of the protagonist Govindankutty, the youngest son of a proud Nair tharavadu, as he is trapped between the social scenario, social injustice and his own inner consciousness. In Asuravithu there are clear indications of the damaging impact of an alien culture in the pollution of the indigenous culture and the disintegration of the family and the community. These two early novels—Naalukettu and Asuravithu—depict a phase in which the economic and cultural scenario of Kerala manifested symptoms which were to develop into dangerous ecocidal tendencies at a later stage.

Manju and Kaalam

His later novels, such as Manju (Mist; 1964) and Kaalam (Time; 1969), are characterised by profuse lyricism which cannot to be found in Naalukettu or Asuravithu. The eco-feminist theme of patriarchal domination and exploitation gains more prominence in Manju, MT's only novel with a female protagonist (Vimala). Set in the splendid landscape of Nainital, it stands apart as set in a milieu different from the usual one, the Valluvanadan village. The plot of the novel is allegedly similar to a Hindi story Parinde (Birds, 1956), by Nirmal Verma. However, both MT and Verma have rejected these claims.

In the novel Kaalam, MT returns to his favourite milieu, the dilapidated joint-family Nair tarwad set against the wider backdrop of the Valluvanadan village in the backdrop of the crumbling matrilineal order of Kerala in a newly independent India. Sethu, the protagonist, is toppled over by the eddies of social, cultural and economic transformation. Kaalam, though not strictly autobiographical, has a strong autobiographical element in it. Manju had a film adaptation in 1983, written and directed by MT himself. The novel also had a Hindi-language film adaptation titled Sarath Sandhya.

Randamoozham

Randamoozham (The Second Turn; 1984), retells the story of the Mahabharatha from the point of view of Bhimasena, supposed to be the son of Vayu; this is demystified or demythified in the novel. In this novel, Bhima gains, through the author's ironic undertones, a new psychological depth. "I have not changed the framework of the story by the first Vyasa, Krishna-Dwaipayana. I have read between his lines and expanded on his pregnant silences," says the author.

Varanasi
MT's latest novel is Varanasi (2002) which is an emotional journey to Varanasi, a pilgrim centre in North India. Varanasi opens with Professor Srinivasan's letter to Sudhakaran, the protagonist, referring to his unfinished thesis among his old books. The professor invites him to his home in Varanasi. Sudharkaran, in his sixties, and recovering from a prostrate procedure, decides to take the professor by surprise. He realises on arrival that the professor has recently died. The story evolves with a series of reminiscences, like a REM stream, in time transitions. The narration involves the third, first, and second person. In the train to Varanasi, Sudhakaran fishes out the book Kashi: The Eternal City by Sumita Nagpal, in which he is also acknowledged. By the time Sudhakaran finishes the book, he has traversed his life, his women, seen the demise of his well-wishers, moved through Varanasi, Mumbai, Bangalore, Paris, and Madras. He sees no need to complete his thesis — 'about the possibilities of Caliban' as once suggested by his professor for a scholarship at the university — and lets it go into the Ganga. He does the professor's last rites as also his own Atma Pindom (One's own funeral rites in anticipation of death). At the Dashashwamedh Ghat, Sumita, now an elderly woman, merely passes him by, not even recognising him. With no intricate plot, the novel is an experiment. It was well received in the literary circles but received criticism from critic and painter M. V. Devan.

Other works
MT wrote the novel Arabi Ponnu (The Gold of Arabia) along with N. P. Mohammed. MT and Mohamed stayed in a rented house in Karuvarakkundu village, Malappuram for a period of two weeks to complete this work.

MT has authored two books on the craft of writing—Kaathikante Panippura and Kaathikante Kala—and his anecdotal columns articles on various topics and speeches on different occasions have been compiled under the titles Kilivaathililude, Kannanthalippookkalude Kaalam, Vakkukalude Vismayam and Eekakikalude Sabdam. Manushyar Nizhalukal and Aalkkoottathil Thaniye are his travelogues.

He occupied and continues to occupy many important and powerful positions in various literary bodies including the presidency of Kerala Sahitya Akademi and the chairmanship of Tunchan Memorial Trust. He was an Executive Member of the Kendra Sahitya Akademi. The Library of Congress has in its collection sixty-two books, mostly by MT and some on him. Also, some of them are translations of his works into English. MT joined the Mathrubhumi Group of Publications in 1956. When he retired from there in 1998, he was their editor of periodicals and Chief Editor of Mathrubhumi Illustrated Weekly. On 2 June 1996, he was bestowed with honorary D.Lit degree by the Calicut University.

Film career

M. T. Vasudevan Nair is one of the most distinguished and well accepted script writers and directors in Malayalam cinema. He has directed seven films and written the screenplay for around 54 films. He won the National Film Award for Best Screenplay four times for: Oru Vadakkan Veeragatha (1989), Kadavu (1991), Sadayam (1992), and Parinayam (1994), which is the most by anyone in the screenplay category.

MT wrote his first screenplay, in 1965 for Murappennu, at the behest of producer Shobhana Parameswaran Nair. The film was an adaptation of his story "Snehathinte Mukhangal". The Hindu described it as "a well-made film with a compelling plot" and as "one of the most significant films in the history of Malayalam cinema".

MT was the first and foremost script writer in Malayalam who wrote screenplays after having learnt cinema as a distinctive visual art which has its own language, grammar and structure. It was only after he began writing screenplays the Malayali viewers began to consider film script as a distinctive genre which has its own genuine features. Also, it was M.T who elevated this medium of writing as a literary from.

MT's screenplays have won social attention for the portrayal of the social and cultural crisis in the contemporary life of Kerala. The
disintegration of human values and relationship which creates identity crisis, sense of loss, dehumanisation, alienation from one's own surroundings, etc. have been presented in its depth by MT more than any other writers. The best examples are Kanyakumari, Varikkuzhi, Vilkkanundu Swapnangal, Sadayam, Asuravithu, Edavazhiyile Poocha Mindappoocha, Akshrangal, Aalkkoottathil Thaniye, Aaroodam etc. A salient aspect of MT's screenplays is the effective presentation of the ecological or geographical factors and elements making use of the visual possibilities of their portrayal. Another unique feature is the language employed in them. Some of his screenplays are known for giving new interpretations to historical characters and historical stories. For instance, he gives the legends woven around the popular story of Perumthachan a new interpretation in his screenplay, based on his own assessment of Perumthachan's character. According to the folklore Vadakkanpattu (Northern Ballads), Chandu is said to have betrayed his cousin because he was jealous of Aaromal's popularity and abilities. But MT's Oru Vadakkan Veeragatha presents an alternative version of the same legend, as it presents the incident from Chandu's perspective, suggesting that grave injustice has been done to Chandu by wrongly accusing him of replacing the rivets.

In 1973, M. T. Vasudevan Nair made his directorial debut with Nirmalyam which won the National Film Award for Best Feature Film. The film is about a village oracle whose services are no longer needed by the community and whose family begins to fall apart. MT scripted and directed many more films including the award-winning Bandhanam, Kadavu and Oru Cheru Punchiri. Kadavu won awards at the Singapore International Film Festival and Tokyo International Film Festival. His cinema work also includes three documentaries and one TV series. He has written songs for the 1981 film Valarthumrugangal which were set to tune by M. B. Sreenivasan.

M. T. Vasudevan Nair was the chairman of Indian Panorama of the 46th National Film Awards (1998). He has also been a member of Film Finance Corporation, National Film Development Corporation and Film Censoring Committee. He has also served as a faculty in the Film and Television Institute, Pune.

Literary style and themes

MT was born and brought up in a sylvan village on the banks of Nila. The writer has so often acknowledged his indebtedness to the ethos of his village and to Nila which has ever been the mainspring of his creative inspiration. Nila occurs and re-occurs in MT's
fiction, as a presence and as a symbol, endorsing this view. The staple locale of his fiction is the Valluvanadan village. The landscape and ethos of the Valluvanad region and the transformations undergone by them in the course of the century, involving relics of the tarawad and the communal tensions provide a challenging theme for the highly evocative style of Vasudevan Nair's narrative art. The temporal milieu of MT's fiction stretches over the second half of the twentieth century, a period of tremendous social, cultural and economic changes.

It was in the sixties that MT rose to prominence as a writer. The phase of social realism had come to an end. In his opinion, class-war the ideal which had inspired the writers belonging to the preceding generation had almost lost its relevance by the time he entered the literary career. The prominent Malayalam writers of the pre-independence phase—Thakazhi, Vallathol and Kesavadev—were all stimulated by the progressive leftist ideals. They focussed their attention on social conflict as the theme for their writings—Conflict between capital and labour, between the landlord and the tenant, between the oppressor and the oppressed. MT felt that this theme of conflict was an outdated phenomenon in the context of present Kerala. The protagonists of MT are men out of society and at war with themselves, a sharp contrast to the heroes of Kesavadev or Thakazhi who fight a losing war against the hostile forces in the society. MT, in spite of his broad and deep sympathy for the marginalized, doesn't identify himself with any particular political ideology or movement.

Awards and honours

Honorary
 1996: Honorary Doctorate by University of Calicut
 1996: Honorary Doctorate by Mahatma Gandhi University
 2005: Padma Bhushan
 2008: Honorary Doctorate by Netaji Subhas Open University
 2022: Kerala Jyothi instituted by Government of Kerala

Literary awards
 1958: Kerala Sahitya Akademi Award for Novel – Naalukettu
 1970: Kendra Sahitya Academy Award – Kaalam
 1982: Kerala Sahitya Akademi Award for Drama – Gopura Nadayil
 1985: Vayalar Award for Randamoozham
 1986: Kerala Sahitya Akademi Award for Story – Swargam Thurakkunna Samayam
 1993: Odakkuzhal Award - Vanaprastham
 1994: Muttathu Varkey Award
 1995: Jnanpith Award for his contributions to Malayalam literature
 1998: Padmarajan Award - Kaazhcha
 2001: Bahrain Keraleeya Samajam Sahithya Award
 2003: Lalithambika Antharjanam Smaraka Sahitya Award
 2005: Kerala Sahitya Akademi Fellowship
 2005: Vallathol Award
 2005: Mathrubhumi Literary Award
 2011: Ezhuthachan Award
 2011: T. K. Puraskaram
 2011: Suvarnamudra Award
 2011: Mayilpeeli Award
 2013: Sahitya Akademi Fellowship
 2013: Sree Chithira Thirunal Award
 2013: K. P. S. Menon Award
 2014: Suvarnamudra Award by Guruvayur Naadha Brahmolsavam
 2014: A. R. Raja Raja Varma Award
 2014: Kakkanadan Award
 2014: Balamani Amma Award
 2014: Tata-Landmark Literature Live! Lifetime Achievement Award
 2015: O.M.C. Narayanan Namboodiripad Memorial Devi Prasadam Trust's Award for Literature
 2015: Thakazhi Award
 2018: O. N. V. Literary Award

Film awards
National Film Awards
 1973: Best Film – Nirmalyam
 1989: Best Screenplay – Oru Vadakkan Veeragatha
 1991: Best Screenplay – Kadavu
 1991: Best Feature Film in Malayalam – Kadavu
 1992: Best Screenplay – Sadayam
 1994: Best Screenplay – Parinayam
 2000: Best Film on Environment Conservation/Preservation – Oru Cheru Punchiri

Kerala State Film Awards
 1970: Best Screenplay – Olavum Theeravum
 1973: Best Film – Nirmalayam
 1973: Best Director – Nirmalayam
 1973: Best Screenplay – Nirmalayam
 1978: Best Film – Bandhanam
 1980: Best Story – Oppol
 1981: Best Screenplay – Thrishna, Valarthu Mrigangal
 1983: Best Story – Aaroodam
 1985: Best Story – Anubandham
 1986: Best Screenplay – Panchagni, Nakhakshathangal
 1987: Best Screenplay – Amrutham Gamaya
 1989: Best Screenplay – Oru Vadakkan Veeragadha
 1990: Best Screenplay – Perumthachan
 1991: Best Film – Kadavu
 1991: Best Director – Kadavu
 1991: Best Screenplay – Kadavu
 1994: Best Story – Sukrutham
 1994: Best Screenplay – Parinayam
 1998: Best Screenplay – Daya
 2000: Best Director – Oru Cheru Punchiri
 2009: Best Screenplay – Pazhassi Raja

 Kerala Film Critics Association Awards
 1978: Best Screenplay – Bandhanam
 1980: Best Screenplay – Vilkkanundu Swapnangal
 1981: Best Story – Valarthumrugangal
 1982: Best Story – Vaarikuzhi
 1984: Best Screenplay – Aalkkoottathil Thaniye
 1985: Best Screenplay – Anubandham
 1985: Best Story – Anubandham
 1994: Best Screenplay – Sukrutham
 1997: Best Screenplay – Ennu Swantham Janakikutty

 Other film awards
1991: Filmfare Lifetime Achievement Award – South
 1992: Singapore International Film Festival - Special Jury Award – Kadavu
 1992: Tokyo International Film Festival - Asia Future Prize – Kadavu
 1996: Kerala State Television Award – Naalukettu
 2003: Asianet Film Awards – Lifetime Achievement Award
 2016: Asianet Film Awards – Lifetime Achievement Award
 2013: J. C. Daniel Award by the Government of Kerala

Bibliography

Novels

Short story collections

Children's literature

Essays

Memoirs

Plays

Speeches

Studies

Translations

Travelogues

Screenplays
Most of MT's screenplays are published as books. Some of the published works include:

Filmography

See also
 List of Indian writers

Notes

References

External links

 

1933 births
Living people
Recipients of the Padma Bhushan in literature & education
Recipients of the Jnanpith Award
Recipients of the Sahitya Akademi Award in Malayalam
Recipients of the Kerala Sahitya Akademi Award
Recipients of the Ezhuthachan Award
Kerala State Film Award winners
Kerala Jyothi Award Winners
Best Original Screenplay National Film Award winners
Producers who won the Best Feature Film National Film Award
Directors who won the Best Feature Film National Film Award
Directors who won the Best Film on Environment Conservation/Preservation National Film Award
J. C. Daniel Award winners
Malayali people
People from Malappuram district
Writers from Kozhikode
Indian male novelists
Indian male short story writers
Indian male dramatists and playwrights
Indian male screenwriters
Malayalam-language writers
Malayalam-language dramatists and playwrights
Malayalam novelists
Malayalam short story writers
Malayalam screenwriters
Malayalam film directors
Government Victoria College, Palakkad alumni
20th-century Indian dramatists and playwrights
20th-century Indian film directors
Screenwriters from Kerala
20th-century Indian short story writers
20th-century Indian novelists
21st-century Indian dramatists and playwrights
21st-century Indian novelists
Novelists from Kerala
20th-century Indian male writers
21st-century Indian male writers
Writers from Kerala